Arthur Peters (8 March 1872 – 24 September 1903) was an Australian cricketer. He played in three first-class matches for South Australia in 1898/99.

See also
 List of South Australian representative cricketers

References

External links
 

1872 births
1903 deaths
Australian cricketers
South Australia cricketers
Cricketers from Adelaide